The Chandler Metropolitan Sedan was manufactured by the Chandler Motor Car Company of Cleveland, Ohio.

Chandler Metropolitan Sedan specifications (1926 data) 

 Color – Two-tone brown or Sagebrush green
 Seating Capacity – Five
 Wheelbase – 123 inches
 Wheels - Wood
 Tires - 33” × 6” balloon
 Service Brakes - contracting on rear wheels
 Emergency Brakes – contracting on transmission
 Engine  - Six-cylinder, vertical, cast en block,  × 5 inches; head removable; valves in side; H.P. 29.4 N.A.C.C. rating
 Lubrication – Force feed
 Crankshaft - Four bearing
 Radiator – Cellular
 Cooling – Water pump
 Ignition –Storage battery
 Starting System – Two Unit
 Voltage – Six to eight
 Wiring System – Single
 Gasoline System – Vacuum
 Clutch – Dry disc
 Transmission – Constant mesh
 Gear Changes – 3 forward, 1 reverse
 Drive – Spiral bevel
 Rear Springs – Semi-elliptic
 Rear Axle – Three-quarter floating
 Steering Gear – Worm and gear

Standard equipment
New car price included the following items:
 tools
 jack
 speedometer
 ammeter
 motometer
 electric horn
 transmission theft lock
 automatic windshield cleaner
 demountable rims
 spare tire carrier
 cowl ventilator
 headlight dimmer
 closed cars have dome light, sun visor, and rear-view mirror.

Optional equipment
The following was available at an extra cost:
 Front Brakes

Prices
New car prices were available upon application on the following models:
 Two Passenger Roadster
 Four Passenger Royal Dispatch
 Five Passenger Touring
 Seven Passenger Touring
 Five Passenger Coach Imperial
 Five Passenger Chummy Sedan
 Five Passenger, Four-door Sedan
 Five Passenger Metropolitan Sedan
 Seven Passenger Sedan
 Seven Passenger Limousine

See also
 Chandler Motor Car

References
Source: 

Cars of the United States